Jean-Marc Ferreri (born 26 December 1962) is a French former professional footballer who earned 37 caps and scored 3 goals for the France national team. He played in the UEFA Euro 1984, where France won the title, and the 1986 FIFA World Cup, where France finished third.

Honours
Auxerre
Division 2: 1979–80

Bordeaux
Challenge des Champions: 1986
Division 1: 1986–87
Coupe de France: 1986–87

Marseille
UEFA Champions League: 1992–93
Division 2: 1994–95

France
UEFA European Championship: 1984
FIFA World Cup third place: 1986

Individual
European Cup top scorer: 1987–88

External links
 
 

1962 births
Living people
French footballers
France international footballers
UEFA Euro 1984 players
1986 FIFA World Cup players
UEFA European Championship-winning players
Ligue 1 players
AJ Auxerre players
FC Girondins de Bordeaux players
Olympique de Marseille players
FC Martigues players
SC Toulon players
FC Zürich players
French expatriate footballers
Expatriate footballers in Switzerland
French expatriate sportspeople in Switzerland
Association football midfielders
Association football forwards
UEFA Champions League winning players
UEFA Champions League top scorers